The 1964 Florida A&M Rattlers football team was an American football team that represented Florida A&M University as a member of the Southern Intercollegiate Athletic Conference (SIAC) during the 1964 NCAA College  Division football season. In the post-season, the Rattlers defeated  in the Orange Blossom Classic.

The team's statistical leaders included Bobby Felts with 468 rushing yards and 10 touchdowns and Ernie Hart with 1,123 passing yards and 66 points scored.

Schedule

References

Florida AandM
Florida A&M Rattlers football seasons
Florida AandM Rattlers football